Disperse Red 11, or 1,4-diamino-2-methoxyanthraquinone, is a red disperse dye derived from anthraquinone. It is water insoluble. 

Disperse Red 11 can be used in plastics and textiles industry to dye polyvinylchloride, polyester, polyamide, and polyurethane materials, such as synthetic fibers and foams. It is also used in cosmetics and in some red and violet-red colored smoke formulations.

References

Anthraquinone dyes
Phenol ethers
Aromatic amines